Luxembourgish euro coins feature three different designs, though they all contain the portrait or effigy of Grand Duke Henri of Luxembourg. The designs, by Yvette Gastauer-Claire, also contain the 12 stars of the EU flag, the year of imprint and the name of the country in the Luxembourgish language: Lëtzebuerg.

The Grand Duke Henri of Luxembourg appears on the coins facing to the left. He was not featured on the Luxembourg franc as he only became Grand Duke in 2000 following the abdication of his father, Jean. Jean's portrait on the francs showed him facing to the right, and it is common in a number of countries for successive monarchs to alternate the direction they faced on coins. Other euro coins issued by member states which are monarchies show their monarchs facing to the left, in common with the effigy on their legacy currencies.

Luxembourg euro design
For images of the common side and a detailed description of the coins, see euro coins.

Circulating mintage quantities

Mints
2002-2004: Royal Dutch Mint (Netherlands)
2005-2006: Mint of Finland
2007-2008: Paris Mint (France)
2009-2018: Royal Dutch Mint (Netherlands)

€2 commemorative coins

Luxembourgish Grand-Ducal Dynasty series

References

External links
European Central Bank – Luxembourg

Euro coins by issuing country
Euro coins
Euro